The handover of Hong Kong from the United Kingdom to the People's Republic of China was at midnight on 1 July 1997. This event ended 156 years of British rule in the former colony. Hong Kong was established as a special administrative region of China (SAR) for 50 years, maintaining its own economic and governing systems from those of mainland China during this time, although influence from the central government in Beijing increased after the passing of the Hong Kong national security law in 2020.

Hong Kong had been a colony of the British Empire since 1841, except for four years of Japanese occupation from 1941 to 1945. After the First Opium War, its territory was expanded on two occasions; in 1860 with the addition of Kowloon Peninsula and Stonecutters Island, and again in 1898, when Britain obtained a 99-year lease for the New Territories. The date of the handover in 1997 marked the end of this lease. The 1984 Sino-British Joint Declaration had set the conditions under which Hong Kong was to be transferred, with China agreeing to maintain existing structures of government and economy under a principle of "one country, two systems" for a period of 50 years. Hong Kong became China's first special administrative region; it was followed by Macau after its transfer from Portugal in 1999 under similar arrangements.

With a 1997 population of about 6.5 million, Hong Kong constituted 97 percent of the total population of all British Dependent Territories at the time and was one of the United Kingdom's last significant colonial territories. Its handover marked the end of British colonial prestige in the Asia-Pacific region where it had never recovered from the Second World War, which included events such as the sinking of Prince of Wales and Repulse and the Fall of Singapore, as well as the subsequent Suez Crisis after the war. The transfer, which was marked by a handover ceremony attended by Charles, Prince of Wales, and broadcast around the world, is often considered to mark the definitive end of the British Empire.

Etymology 
Following the end of the Second World War, both the Kuomintang and the Chinese Communist Party (CCP) proposed "(China) to recover Hong Kong", which had since been the common descriptive statement in China, Hong Kong and Taiwan until mid-1990s. "Reunification of Hong Kong" was seldom used by a minority of pro-Beijing politicians, lawyers and newspapers during Sino-British negotiations in 1983 to 1984, only, of its Chinese translation, to become mainstream in Hong Kong at latest in early 1997. A similar phrase "return of Hong Kong to the motherland" is also often used by Hong Kong and Chinese officials. Nevertheless, "Handover of Hong Kong" is still mainly used in the English-speaking world.

"Transfer of sovereignty over Hong Kong" is another description frequently used by Hong Kong officials and the media, as well as non-locals and academics, which is not recognized by the Chinese Government. Beijing claims neither the Qing dynasty exercised sovereignty of Hong Kong after ceding it, nor the British therefore did, and hence the transfer of sovereignty to China from Britain is not logically possible. As no consensus reached on the sovereignty transferring, the Chinese stated "to recover the Hong Kong area" and "to resume the exercise of sovereignty over Hong Kong" in the Sino-British Joint Declaration, while the British declared "(to) restore Hong Kong to the People's Republic of China".

Background 

By the 1820s and 1830s, the British had conquered parts of India and had intentions of growing cotton in these lands to offset the amount of cotton they were buying from America. When this endeavour failed, the British realised they could grow poppies at an incredible rate. These poppies could then be turned into opium, which the Chinese highly desired, but their laws prohibited. So the British plan was to grow poppies in India, convert it into opium, smuggle the opium into China and trade it for tea, and sell the tea back in Britain. The illegal opium trade was highly successful, and the drug was very profitably smuggled into China in extremely large volumes.

The United Kingdom obtained control over portions of Hong Kong's territory through three treaties concluded with Qing China after the Opium Wars:

 1842 Treaty of Nanking: Hong Kong Island ceded in perpetuity
 1860 Convention of Peking: Kowloon Peninsula and Stonecutter's Island additionally ceded
 1898 Convention for the Extension of Hong Kong Territory: the New Territories and outlying islands leased for 99 years until 1997

Despite the finite nature of the New Territories lease, this portion of the colony was developed just as rapidly as, and became highly integrated with, the rest of Hong Kong. As the end of the lease approached, and by the time of serious negotiations over the future status of Hong Kong in the 1980s, it was thought impractical to separate the ceded territories and return only the New Territories to China. In addition, with the scarcity of land and natural resources in Hong Kong Island and Kowloon, large-scale infrastructure investments had been made in the New Territories, with break-evens lying well past 30 June 1997.

When the People's Republic of China obtained its seat in the United Nations as a result of the UN General Assembly Resolution 2758 in 1971, it began to act diplomatically on its previously lost sovereignty over both Hong Kong and Macau. In March 1972, the Chinese UN representative, Huang Hua, wrote to the United Nations Decolonization Committee to state the position of the Chinese government:

"The questions of Hong Kong and Macau belong to the category of questions resulting from the series of unequal treaties which the imperialists imposed on China. Hong Kong and Macau are part of Chinese territory occupied by the British and Portuguese authorities. The settlement of the questions of Hong Kong and Macau is entirely within China's sovereign right and do not at all fall under the ordinary category of colonial territories. Consequently, they should not be included in the list of colonial territories covered by the declaration on the granting of independence to colonial territories and people. With regard to the questions of Hong Kong and Macau, the Chinese government has consistently held that they should be settled in an appropriate way when conditions are ripe."

The same year, on 8 November, the United Nations General Assembly passed the resolution on removing Hong Kong and Macau from the official list of colonies.

In March 1979 the Governor of Hong Kong, Murray MacLehose, paid his first official visit to the People's Republic of China (PRC), taking the initiative to raise the question of Hong Kong's sovereignty with CCP vice chairman Deng Xiaoping. Without clarifying and establishing the official position of the PRC government, the arranging of real estate leases and loans agreements in Hong Kong within the next 18 years would become difficult.

In response to concerns over land leases in the New Territories, MacLehose proposed that British administration of the whole of Hong Kong, as opposed to sovereignty, be allowed to continue after 1997. He also proposed that contracts include the phrase "for so long as the Crown administers the territory".

In fact, as early as the mid-1970s, Hong Kong had faced additional risks raising loans for large-scale infrastructure projects such as its Mass Transit Railway (MTR) system and a new airport. Caught unprepared, Deng asserted the necessity of Hong Kong's return to China, upon which Hong Kong would be given special status by the PRC government.

MacLehose's visit to the PRC raised the curtain on the issue of Hong Kong's sovereignty: Britain was made aware of the PRC's intent to resume sovereignty over Hong Kong, and began to make arrangements accordingly to ensure the sustenance of her interests within the territory, as well as initiating the creation of a withdrawal plan in case of emergency.

Three years later, Deng received the former British Prime Minister Edward Heath, who had been dispatched as the special envoy of Prime Minister Margaret Thatcher to establish an understanding of the PRC's plans with regards to the retrocession of Hong Kong; during their meeting, Deng outlined his plans to make the territory a special economic zone, which would retain its capitalist system under Chinese sovereignty.

In the same year, Edward Youde, who succeeded MacLehose as the 26th Governor of Hong Kong, led a delegation of five Executive Councillors to London, including Chung Sze-yuen, Lydia Dunn, and Roger Lobo. Chung presented their position on the sovereignty of Hong Kong to Thatcher, encouraging her to take into consideration the interests of the native Hong Kong population in her upcoming visit to China.

In light of the increasing openness of the PRC government and economic reforms on the mainland, the then British Prime Minister Margaret Thatcher sought the PRC's agreement to a continued British presence in the territory.

However, the PRC took a contrary position: not only did the PRC wish for the New Territories, on lease until 1997, to be placed under the PRC's jurisdiction, it also refused to recognise the onerous "unfair and unequal treaties" under which Hong Kong Island and Kowloon had been ceded to Britain in perpetuity after the Opium Wars. Consequently, the PRC recognised only the British administration in Hong Kong, but not British sovereignty.

Talks

Before the negotiations
In the wake of Governor MacLehose's visit, Britain and the PRC established initial diplomatic contact for further discussions of the Hong Kong question, paving the way for Thatcher's first visit to the PRC in September 1982.

Margaret Thatcher, in discussion with Deng Xiaoping, reiterated the validity of an extension of the lease of Hong Kong territory, particularly in light of binding treaties, including the Treaty of Nanking in 1842, the Convention of Peking in 1856, and the Convention for the Extension of Hong Kong Territory signed in 1890.

In response, Deng Xiaoping cited clearly the lack of room for compromise on the question of sovereignty over Hong Kong; the PRC, as the successor of Qing dynasty and the Republic of China on the mainland, would recover the entirety of the New Territories, Kowloon and Hong Kong Island. China considered treaties about Hong Kong as unequal and ultimately refused to accept any outcome that would indicate permanent loss of sovereignty over Hong Kong's area, whatever wording the former treaties had.

During talks with Thatcher, China planned to seize Hong Kong if the negotiations set off unrest in the colony. Thatcher later said that Deng told her bluntly that China could easily take Hong Kong by force, stating that "I could walk in and take the whole lot this afternoon", to which she replied that "there is nothing I could do to stop you, but the eyes of the world would now know what China is like".

After her visit with Deng in Beijing, Thatcher was received in Hong Kong as the first British Prime Minister to set foot on the territory whilst in office. At a press conference, Thatcher re-emphasised the validity of the three treaties, asserting the need for countries to respect treaties on universal terms: "There are three treaties in existence; we stick by our treaties unless we decide on something else. At the moment, we stick by our treaties."

At the same time, at the 5th session of the 5th National People's Congress, the constitution was amended to include a new Article 31 which stated that the country might establish Special Administrative Regions (SARs) when necessary.

The additional Article would hold tremendous significance in settling the question of Hong Kong and later Macau, putting into social consciousness the concept of "One country, two systems".

Negotiations begin
A few months after Thatcher's visit to Beijing, the PRC government had yet to open negotiations with the British government regarding the sovereignty of Hong Kong.

Shortly before the initiation of sovereignty talks, Governor Youde declared his intention to represent the population of Hong Kong at the negotiations. This statement sparked a strong response from the PRC, prompting Deng Xiaoping to denounce talk of "the so-called 'three-legged stool", which implied that Hong Kong was a party to talks on its future, alongside Beijing and London.

At the preliminary stage of the talks, the British government proposed an exchange of sovereignty for administration and the implementation of a British administration post-handover.

The PRC government refused, contending that the notions of sovereignty and administration were inseparable, and although it recognised Macau as a "Chinese territory under Portuguese administration", this was only temporary.

In fact, during informal exchanges between 1979 and 1981, the PRC had proposed a "Macau solution" in Hong Kong, under which it would remain under British administration at China's discretion.

However, this had previously been rejected following the 1967 Leftist riots, with the then Governor, David Trench, claiming the leftists' aim was to leave the UK without effective control, or "to Macau us".

The conflict that arose at that point of the negotiations ended the possibility of further negotiation. During the reception of former British Prime Minister Edward Heath during his sixth visit to the PRC, Deng Xiaoping commented quite clearly on the impossibility of exchanging sovereignty for administration, declaring an ultimatum: the British government must modify or give up its position or the PRC will announce its resolution of the issue of Hong Kong sovereignty unilaterally.

In 1983, Typhoon Ellen ravaged Hong Kong, causing great amounts of damage to both life and property. The Hong Kong dollar plummeted on Black Saturday, and the Financial Secretary John Bremridge publicly associated the economic uncertainty with the instability of the political climate. In response, the PRC government condemned Britain through the press for "playing the economic card" in order to achieve their ends: to intimidate the PRC into conceding to British demands.

British concession

Governor Youde with nine members of the Hong Kong Executive Council travelled to London to discuss with Prime Minister Thatcher the crisis of confidence—the problem with morale among the people of Hong Kong arising from the ruination of the Sino-British talks. The session concluded with Thatcher's writing of a letter addressed to the PRC Premier Zhao Ziyang.

In the letter, she expressed Britain's willingness to explore arrangements optimising the future prospects of Hong Kong while utilising the PRC's proposals as a foundation. Furthermore, and perhaps most significantly, she expressed Britain's concession on its position of a continued British presence in the form of an administration post-handover.

Two rounds of negotiations were held in October and November. On the sixth round of talks in November, Britain formally conceded its intentions of either maintaining a British administration in Hong Kong or seeking some form of co-administration with the PRC, and showed its sincerity in discussing PRC's proposal on the 1997 issue. Obstacles were cleared.

Simon Keswick, chairman of Jardine Matheson & Co., said they were not pulling out of Hong Kong, but a new holding company would be established in Bermuda instead. The PRC took this as yet another plot by the British. The Hong Kong government explained that it had been informed about the move only a few days before the announcement. The government would not and could not stop the company from making a business decision.

Just as the atmosphere of the talks was becoming cordial, members of the Legislative Council of Hong Kong felt impatient at the long-running secrecy over the progress of Sino-British talks on the Hong Kong issue. A motion, tabled by legislator Roger Lobo, declared "This Council deems it essential that any proposals for the future of Hong Kong should be debated in this Council before agreement is reached", was passed unanimously.

The PRC attacked the motion furiously, referring to it as "somebody's attempt to play the three-legged stool trick again". At length, the PRC and Britain initiated the Joint Declaration on the question of Hong Kong's future in Beijing. Zhou Nan, the then PRC Deputy Foreign Minister and leader of the negotiation team, and Sir Richard Evans, British Ambassador to Beijing and leader of the team, signed respectively on behalf of the two governments.

Sino-British Joint Declaration

The Sino-British Joint Declaration was signed by Premier of the People's Republic of China Zhao Ziyang and Prime Minister of the United Kingdom Margaret Thatcher on 19 December 1984 in Beijing. The Declaration entered into force with the exchange of instruments of ratification on 27 May 1985 and was registered by the People's Republic of China and United Kingdom governments at the United Nations on 12 June 1985.

In the Joint Declaration, the People's Republic of China Government stated that it had decided to resume the exercise of sovereignty over Hong Kong (including Hong Kong Island, Kowloon, and the New Territories) with effect from 1 July 1997 and the United Kingdom Government declared that it would restore Hong Kong to the PRC with effect from 1 July 1997. In the document, the People's Republic of China Government also declared its basic policies regarding Hong Kong.

In accordance with the "One country, two systems" principle agreed between the United Kingdom and the People's Republic of China,  the socialist system of the People's Republic of China would not be practised in the Hong Kong Special Administrative Region (HKSAR), and Hong Kong's previous capitalist system and its way of life would remain unchanged for a period of 50 years. This would have left Hong Kong unchanged until 2047.

The ceremony of the signing of the Sino-British Joint Declaration took place at 18:00, 19 December 1984 at the Western Main Chamber of the Great Hall of the People. The Hong Kong and Macao Affairs Office initially released a proposed list of 60–80 native residents of Hong Kong to be in attendance at the ceremony, later increasing the number to 101.

The list included Hong Kong government officials, members of the Legislative and Executive Councils, chairmen of the Hongkong and Shanghai Banking Corporation and Standard Chartered Bank, prominent businessmen such as Li Ka-shing, Pao Yue-kong and Fok Ying-tung, and also Martin Lee Chu-ming and Szeto Wah.

Universal suffrage

The Hong Kong Basic Law ensured, among other things, that Hong Kong will retain its legislative system, and people's rights and freedom for fifty years, as a special administrative region (SAR) of China. The central government in Beijing maintains control over Hong Kong's foreign affairs as well as the legal interpretation of the Basic Law. The latter has led democracy advocates and some Hong Kong residents to argue, after the fact,  that the territory has yet to achieve universal suffrage as promised by the Basic Law, leading to mass demonstrations in 2014. In 2019, demonstrations that started as a protest against an extradition law also led to massive demonstrations (1.7 million on 11 and 18 August 2019), again demanding universal suffrage, but also the resignation of Carrie Lam (the then-Chief Executive).

In December 2021, Beijing released a document titled "Hong Kong Democratic Progress Under the Framework of One Country, Two Systems", the second such white paper on Hong Kong affairs since 2014. It stated that the central government will work with "all social groups, sectors and stakeholders towards the ultimate goal of election by universal suffrage of the chief executive" and the LegCo while also noting that the Chinese constitution and the Basic Law together "empower the HKSAR to exercise a high degree of autonomy and confirm the central authorities' right to supervise the exercise of this autonomy".

Drafting of Basic Law

The Basic Law was drafted by a Drafting Committee composed of members from both Hong Kong and Mainland China. A Basic Law Consultative Committee formed purely by Hong Kong people was established in 1985 to canvas views in Hong Kong on the drafts.

The first draft was published in April 1988, followed by a five-month public consultation exercise. The second draft was published in February 1989, and the subsequent consultation period ended in October 1989.

The Basic Law was formally promulgated on 4 April 1990 by the NPC, together with the designs for the flag and emblem of the HKSAR. Some members of the Basic Law drafting committee were ousted by Beijing following 4 June 1989 Tiananmen Square protests, after voicing views supporting the student protesters.

The Basic Law was said to be a mini-constitution drafted with the participation of Hong Kong people. The political system had been the most controversial issue in the drafting of the Basic Law. The special issue sub-group adopted the political model put forward by Louis Cha. This "mainstream" proposal was criticised for being too conservative.

According to Clauses 158 and 159 of the Basic Law, powers of interpretation and amendment of the Basic Law are vested in the Standing Committee of the National People's Congress and the National People's Congress, respectively. Hong Kong's people have limited influence.

Tide of migration
After the Tiananmen Square protests of 1989, the Executive Councillors and the Legislative Councillors of Hong Kong unexpectedly held an urgent meeting, in which they agreed unanimously that the British Government should give the people of Hong Kong the right of abode in the United Kingdom.

More than 10,000 Hong Kong residents rushed to Central in order to get an application form for residency in the United Kingdom. On the eve of the deadline, over 100,000 lined up overnight for a British National (Overseas) application form. While mass migration began well before 1989, the event led to the peak migration year in 1992 with 66,000 leaving.

Many citizens were pessimistic towards the future of Hong Kong and the transfer of the region's sovereignty. A tide of emigration, which was to last for no less than five years, broke out. At its peak, citizenship of small countries, such as Tonga, was also in great demand.

Singapore, which also had a predominantly Chinese population, was another popular destination, with the country's Commission (now Consulate-General) being besieged by anxious Hong Kong residents. By September 1989, 6,000 applications for residency in Singapore had been approved by the commission. Some consul staff were suspended or arrested for their corrupt behaviour in granting immigration visas.

In April 1997, the acting immigration officer at the US Consulate-General, James DeBates, was suspended after his wife was arrested for the smuggling of Chinese migrants into the United States. The previous year, his predecessor, Jerry Stuchiner, had been arrested for smuggling forged Honduran passports into the territory before being sentenced to 40 months in prison.

Canada (Vancouver and Toronto), the United Kingdom (London, Glasgow, and Manchester), Australia (Perth, Sydney and Melbourne), and the United States (San Francisco, New York, and Los Angeles's San Gabriel Valley) were, by and large, the most popular destinations. The United Kingdom devised the British Nationality Selection Scheme, granting 50,000 families British citizenship under the British Nationality Act (Hong Kong) 1990.

Vancouver was among the most popular destinations, earning the nickname of  "Hongcouver". Richmond, a suburb of Vancouver, was nicknamed "Little Hong Kong". All in all, from the start of the settlement of the negotiation in 1984 to 1997, nearly 1 million people emigrated; consequently, Hong Kong suffered serious loss of human and financial capital.

Last governor

Chris Patten became the last governor of Hong Kong. This was regarded as a turning point in Hong Kong's history. Unlike his predecessors, Patten was not a diplomat, but a career politician and former Member of Parliament. He introduced democratic reforms which pushed PRC–British relations to a standstill and affected the negotiations for a smooth handover.

Patten introduced a package of electoral reforms in the Legislative Council. These reforms proposed to enlarge the electorate, thus making voting in the Legislative Council more democratic. This move posed significant changes because Hong Kong citizens would have the power to make decisions regarding their future.

Handover ceremony

The handover ceremony was held at the new wing of the Hong Kong Convention and Exhibition Centre in Wan Chai on the night of 30 June 1997.

The principal British guest was Prince Charles, who read a farewell speech on behalf of Queen Elizabeth II. The newly elected Labour prime minister, Tony Blair; the foreign secretary, Robin Cook; the departing governor, Chris Patten; and the chief of the Defence Staff, General Sir Charles Guthrie, also attended.

Representing the People's Republic of China were the CCP general secretary and Chinese president, Jiang Zemin, the Chinese premier, Li Peng, and the first chief executive Tung Chee-hwa. The event was broadcast around the world.

Additional effects

Before and after handover

Rose Garden Project

After the Tiananmen Square protests of 1989, the Hong Kong government proposed a grand "Rose Garden Project" to restore faith and solidarity among the residents. As the construction of the new Hong Kong International Airport would extend well after the handover, Governor Wilson met PRC Premier Li Peng in Beijing to ease the mind of the PRC government.

The communist press published stories that the project was an evil plan to bleed Hong Kong dry before the handover, leaving the territory in serious debt. After three years of negotiations, Britain and the PRC finally reached an agreement over the construction of the new airport, and signed a Memorandum of Understanding. Removing hills and reclaiming land, it took only a few years to construct the new airport.

Views of the Kowloon Walled City

The Walled City was originally a single fort built in the mid-19th century on the site of an earlier 17th-century watch post on the Kowloon Peninsula of Hong Kong. After the ceding of Hong Kong Island to Britain in 1842 (Treaty of Nanjing), Manchu Qing Dynasty authorities of China felt it necessary for them to establish a military and administrative post to rule the area and to check further British influence in the area.

The 1898 Convention which handed additional parts of Hong Kong (the New Territories) to Britain for 99 years excluded the Walled City, with a population of roughly 700. It stated that China could continue to keep troops there, so long as they did not interfere with Britain's temporary rule.

Britain quickly went back on this unofficial part of the agreement, attacking Kowloon Walled City in 1899, only to find it deserted. They did nothing with it, or the outpost, and thus posed the question of Kowloon Walled City's ownership squarely up in the air. The outpost consisted of a yamen, as well as buildings which grew into low-lying, densely packed neighbourhoods from the 1890s to 1940s.

The enclave remained part of Chinese territory despite the turbulent events of the early 20th century that saw the fall of the Qing government, the establishment of the Republic of China and, later, a Communist Chinese government (PRC).

Squatters began to occupy the Walled City, resisting several attempts by Britain in 1948 to drive them out. The Walled City became a haven for criminals and drug addicts, as the Hong Kong Police had no right to enter the City and China refused maintainability. The 1949 foundation of the People's Republic of China added thousands of refugees to the population, many from Guangdong; by this time, Britain had had enough, and simply adopted a "hands-off" policy.

A murder that occurred in Kowloon Walled City in 1959 set off a small diplomatic crisis, as the two nations each tried to get the other to accept responsibility for a vast tract of land now virtually ruled by anti-Manchurian Triads.

After the Joint Declaration in 1984, the PRC allowed British authorities to demolish the city and resettle its inhabitants. The mutual decision to tear down the walled city was made in 1987. The government spent up to HK$3 billion to resettle the residents and shops.

Some residents were not satisfied with the compensation, and some even obstructed the demolition in every possible way. Ultimately, everything was settled, and the Walled City became a park.

International reaction
The Republic of China on Taiwan promulgated the Laws and Regulations Regarding Hong Kong & Macao Affairs on 2 April 1997 by Presidential Order, and the Executive Yuan on 19 June 1997 ordered the provisions pertaining to Hong Kong to take effect on 1 July 1997.

The United States–Hong Kong Policy Act or more commonly known as the Hong Kong Policy Act (PL no. 102-383m 106 Stat. 1448) is a 1992 act enacted by the United States Congress.  It allows the United States to continue to treat Hong Kong separately from China for matters concerning trade export and economics control after the handover.

The United States was represented by then Secretary of State Madeleine Albright at the Hong Kong handover ceremony. However, she partially boycotted it in protest of China's dissolution of the democratically elected Hong Kong legislature.

End of the British Empire

The handover marked the end of British rule in Hong Kong, which was Britain's last substantial overseas territory.  Although in statute law set down by Parliament, British Hong Kong had no status of pre-eminence vis-a-vis the other British Dependent Territories (as they were then classified before the term British Overseas Territory was introduced in 2002), Hong Kong was by far the most populous and economically potent.  In 1997 the colony had a population of approximately 6.5 million, which represented roughly 97% of the population of the British Dependent Territories as a whole at that time (the next largest, Bermuda, having a 1997 population of approximately only 62,000).  With a gross domestic product of approximately US$180 billion in the last year of British rule, Hong Kong's economy was roughly 11% the size of Britain's.  Therefore, although the economies of the United Kingdom and Hong Kong were measured separately, the Handover did mean the British economy in its very broadest sense became substantially smaller (by comparison, the acquisition of Hong Kong boosted the size of the Chinese economy, which was then smaller than the United Kingdom's, by 18.4%). As a comparator to Hong Kong, in 2017 Bermuda (as with population, the economically largest of Britain's remaining territories) had a GDP of only US$4.7 billion.

The cession of Hong Kong meant that Britain's remaining territories (excepting the United Kingdom itself) henceforth consisted either of uninhabited lands (for instance the British Antarctic Territory), small islands or micro land masses (such as Montserrat), territories used as military bases (for example Akrotiri and Dhekelia on the island of Cyprus, itself a former crown colony granted independence in 1960), or a combination of the latter two (like Gibraltar). While many of Britain's remaining territories are significant to the global economy by virtue of being offshore financial centres (Bermuda, the British Virgin Islands, and the Cayman Islands being the most prominent of these), their economies are insubstantial.  Demographically, they are also tiny compared to Britain, with a collective population of less than 0.4% of Britain's 2017 population of 66 million. As of 2018, the combined population of Britain's remaining fourteen Overseas Territories is approximately 250,000, which is less than all but three districts of Hong Kong, and roughly equal to that of the City of Westminster.

Consequently, because ceding Hong Kong came at the end of half a century of decolonisation, and because the handover meant that the United Kingdom became without significant overseas territories, dominions, or colonies for the first time in its history (Great Britain, having been bequeathed the incipient domains of its later empire by inheriting the colonial possessions of the Kingdom of England upon the passing of the Acts of Union 1707, always having been an imperial power, ab initio), the handover of Hong Kong to China is regarded by some as marking the conclusion of the British Empire, with 1 July 1997 being its end date and the handover ceremony being its last diplomatic act.

In popular culture
Scholars have begun to study the complexities of the transfer as shown in the popular media, such as films, television and video and online games. For example, Hong Kong director Fruit Chan made a sci-fi thriller The Midnight After (2014) that stressed the sense of loss and alienation represented by survivors in an apocalyptic Hong Kong. Chan infuses a political agenda in the film by playing on Hong Kongers' collective anxiety towards communist China. Yiman Wang has argued that America has viewed China through the prisms of films from Shanghai and Hong Kong, with a recent emphasis on futuristic disaster films set in Hong Kong after the transfer goes awry. 
The handover is central to the plot of the 1998 action comedy Rush Hour.
It is also mentioned in another 1998 film — Knock Off.
The handover is the backdrop for "A Death in Hong Kong", the first episode the tenth season of Murder, She Wrote.
Hong Kong Cantopop artist Sam Hui has made numerous references to 1997 including the song "Could Not Care Less About 1997" (話知你97).
The 1991 song "Queen's Road East" by Lo Ta-yu featuring Ram Chiang satirically expresses the anxiety felt by Hong Kong residents over the handover.
Chinese American rapper Jin Auyeung has a song called "1997" in his Cantonese album ABC, which he makes references to the handover, ten years since Hong Kong's return to China.
Zero Minus Ten, a James Bond novel by Raymond Benson, is set largely in Hong Kong during the days leading up to the Handover.
The 2012 James Bond film Skyfall features a villain who had been an MI6 agent in Hong Kong until the Handover, when he was handed over to the Chinese for his unauthorised hacking of their security networks.
 The Doctor Who Unbound audio drama Sympathy for the Devil by Jonathan Clements is set on the eve of the Handover and involves an attempted defection by a war criminal, only hours before China takes control.
Hong Kong 97, a 1994 American movie starring Robert Patrick, is set in Hong Kong during the 24 hours before the end of British rule.
Hong Kong 97, a 1995 Japanese homebrew SNES game, is set in Hong Kong around the time of the transition. The player controls Chin (Jackie Chan), who was called by the Hong Kong government to kill the invading Chinese, including Tong Shau Ping. The game gained a cult following due to its very poor quality and absurd plot.
The handover of Hong Kong is referenced multiple times and witnessed in the 1997 film Chinese Box, starring Jeremy Irons and Gong Li.  The film itself was filmed leading up to and during the handover.
The handover of Hong Kong is portrayed in the fifth season of Netflix's historical-drama series The Crown (2022), in the season's final episode "Decommissioned"

See also
History of Chinese immigration to Canada
Hong Kong people in the United Kingdom
Hong Kong Act 1985
Monument in Commemoration of the Return of Hong Kong to China
Transfer of sovereignty over Macau
Hong Kong 1 July marches
Hong Kong–Mainland conflict

Bibliography
 
 
 Flowerdew, John. The final years of British Hong Kong: The discourse of colonial withdrawal (Springer, 1998). 
 Lane, Kevin. Sovereignty and the status quo: the historical roots of China's Hong Kong policy (Westview Press, 1990). 
 Mark, Chi-kwan. "To 'educate' Deng Xiaoping in capitalism: Thatcher's visit to China and the future of Hong Kong in 1982". Cold War History Number 17 (December 2015): 1–20.
 Tang, James TH. "From empire defence to imperial retreat: Britain's postwar China policy and the decolonization of Hong Kong". Modern Asian Studies Vol. 28 Number 2 (May 1994): 317–337.

Notes

References

Further reading
 
  – Transcript broadcast on 13 June 1997

External links
  – BBC World Service - On Air - January and May 1997
 HONG KONG: THE RETURN TO CHINA – Washington Post Special Report
  - South China Morning Post 

History of Hong Kong
British Hong Kong
1997 in Hong Kong
1997 in China
1997 in the United Kingdom
1997 in international relations
1990s in Hong Kong
China–United Kingdom relations
Hong Kong–United Kingdom relations
Sovereignty
July 1997 events in Asia
Decolonization